|}

The Greenlands Stakes is a Group 2 flat horse race in Ireland open to thoroughbreds aged four years or older. It is run at the Curragh over a distance of 6 furlongs (1,207 metres), and it is scheduled to take place each year in May.

The event is named after Greenlands, the area of the Curragh plain where the racecourse is located. It is held on the same afternoon as the Irish 2,000 Guineas. Prior to 2015 it was also open to three-year-olds and was contested at Group 3 level.

Records
Most successful horse since 1950 (2 wins):
 College Chapel – 1993, 1994
 Hitchens - 2011, 2013

Leading jockey since 1950 (6 wins):
 Lester Piggott – Home Guard (1973), Boone's Cabin (1975), Golden Thatch (1979), Archway (1991), College Chapel (1993, 1994)

Leading trainer since 1950 (13 wins):
 Vincent O'Brien – King's Jester (1958), Abergwaun (1972), Home Guard (1973), Saritamer (1974), Boone's Cabin (1975), Golden Thatch (1979), Drama (1981), Belted Earl (1982), Exhibitioner (1985), Puissance (1989), Archway (1991), College Chapel (1993, 1994)

Winners since 1983

Earlier winners

 1950: Turkish Prince
 1951: Owen o' Cork
 1952: Prince of Fairfield
 1953: Starial
 1954: Standing Holly
 1955: Away Home / By-Passed
 1956: Who You
 1957: Persian
 1958: King's Jester
 1959: Renegade
 1960: Mutara
 1961: Enamoured
 1962: Ahascragh
 1963: Red Slipper
 1964: Victoria Quay
 1965: Majority Blue
 1966: Washington
 1967: Cambusdoon
 1968: Polar Gold
 1969: Desert Call
 1970: Everyday
 1971: Cinerama Two
 1972: Abergwaun
 1973: Home Guard
 1974: Saritamer
 1975: Boone's Cabin
 1976: Petipa
 1977: Balgaddy
 1978: Ballad Rock
 1979: Golden Thatch
 1980: Jasmine Star
 1981: Drama
 1982: Belted Earl

See also
 Horse racing in Ireland
 List of Irish flat horse races

References

 Paris-Turf:
 Racing Post:

 galopp-sieger.de – Greenlands Stakes.
 ifhaonline.org – International Federation of Horseracing Authorities – Greenlands Stakes (2019).
 irishracinggreats.com – Greenlands Stakes (Group 3).
 pedigreequery.com – Greenlands Stakes – Curragh.

Flat races in Ireland
Curragh Racecourse
Open sprint category horse races